Blooded Palace: The War of Flowers is a 2013 South Korean historical television series starring Kim Hyun-joo, Lee Deok-hwa, Song Seon-mi, Jung Sung-mo, Jung Sung-woon, Kim Joo-young, Go Won-hee, and Jun Tae-soo. It aired on jTBC from March 23 to September 8, 2013 on Saturdays and Sundays at 20:45 (KST) time slot for 50 episodes.

The series was streamed online on YouTube.

Synopsis
It depicts a cruel hidden story within the royal court. Royal concubine Gwi-in Jo (Kim Hyun-joo) wants to make her son the king. In order to accomplish her goal, she holds the hand of Kim Ja-jeom and uses King Injo. She also attempts to get rid of Crown Prince Sohyeon.

Cast

 Kim Hyun-joo as Yamjeon / Consort Gwi-in Jo
 Lee Chae-mi as young Yamjeon 
 Lee Deok-hwa as King Injo
 Shin Soo-yeon as Seol-hwa
 Song Seon-mi as Crown Princess Minhoe
 Jung Sung-mo as Kim Ja-jeom
 Jung Sung-woon as Crown Prince Sohyeon
 Kim Joo-young as Grand Prince Bongrim
 Go Won-hee as Queen Jangnyeol 
 Jun Tae-soo as Nam Hyeok 
 Jung Sun-kyung as Han Ok, Lady Jo's mother
 Son Byong-ho as Lee Hyeong-ik
 Seo Yi-sook as Seol-jook
 Lee Seol-hee as Yoo-deok
 Lee Seo-yun as Lady Park (Park Sukui)
 Kim Ha-kyun as Choi Myung-kil
 Han In-soo as Kim Sang-hun
 Kim Kyu-chul as Shim Ki-won
 Woo Hyun as eunuch Kim In
 Nam Neung-mi as Nam Hyeok's mother
 Kim San as Ma Bo-dae
 Kim Jong-kyul as Kim Ryu
  as Princess Hyomyeong
 Lee Chae-mi as young Princess Hyomyeong
 Jung Yoon-seok as Shunzhi Emperor

Ratings
In this table,  represent the lowest ratings and  represent the highest ratings.

Awards and nominations

References

External links
  
 
 

2013 South Korean television series debuts
2013 South Korean television series endings
JTBC television dramas
Korean-language television shows
Television series set in the Joseon dynasty
South Korean historical television series
Television series by Drama House